Dune Warriors is a 1991 American action sci-fi film co-produced and directed by Cirio H. Santiago. The film stars David Carradine.

Several film critics consider the film a rip-off of Mad Max.

Plot
Set in the year 2040, a group of outlaws prey upon the small cities in hopes to obtain any water they might possess. When they attempt to take over the town of Chinle, a mysterious warrior named Michael (Carradine) leads a band of fighters to ward off their attack.

Cast
 David Carradine as Michael
 Rick Hill as John
 Luke Askew as William
 Jillian McWhirter as Val
 Blake Boyd as Dorian
 Val Garay as Jason
 Joseph Zucchero as Reynaldo
 Bon Vibar as Emilio
 Henry Strzalkowski as Luis
 Dante Varona as Ricardo
 Maria Isabel Lopez as Miranda
 Nick Nicholson as Tomas
 Ned Hourani as Randall
 Daniel Nicholson as Village Boy
 Joanne Griffin as Mother

References

External links

1991 films
1991 action films
1990s science fiction action films
American science fiction action films
1990s English-language films
Films directed by Cirio H. Santiago
1990s American films